[[File:Guinness Baronet Arms.png|thumb|Arms of Guinness, Baronet of Ashford and St. Stephen's Green:  Quarterly, 1st and 4th, Per saltire Gules and Azure a Lion rampant Or on a Chief Ermine a Dexter Hand couped at the wrist of the first'(for Guinness); 2nd and 3rd, Argent on a Fess between three Crescents Sable a Trefoil slipped Or (for Lee), with canton of baronet]]

There have been two baronetcies created for members of the Guinness brewing family, both in the Baronetage of the United Kingdom. As of 2014 both titles are extant.

The Guinness Baronetcy, of Ashford in the County of Galway, is a title in the Baronetage of the United Kingdom. It was created on 15 April 1867 for the brewer, philanthropist and conservative member of parliament Benjamin Guinness. He was a grandson of Arthur Guinness, the founder of the Guinness brewery. His son, the second baronet, was also a businessman and conservative politician and contributed to numerous charitable causes. On 1 May 1880 he was created Baron Ardilaun, of Ashford in the County of Galway, in the Peerage of the United Kingdom.

Lord Ardilaun was childless and the barony became extinct on his death in 1915. However, he was succeeded in the baronetcy by his nephew Sir Algernon, the third baronet, the son of Benjamin Lee Guinness, second son of the first baronet.  the title is held by the third baronet's greatnephew, the fifth baronet, who succeeded his father in 2011. He is the grandson of Kenelm Lee Guinness, grandson of the first baronet.

The family seat was Ashford Castle, near Cong, County Galway.

The Guinness Baronetcy, of Castleknock in the County Dublin, was created in the Baronetage of the United Kingdom on 27 May 1885 for Edward Guinness. He was the third son of the first baronet of the 1867 creation. Guinness was later elevated to the peerage as Earl of Iveagh. For more information, see this title. Walter Guinness, 1st Baron Moyne was the third son of the first Earl of Iveagh.

Guinness baronets, of Ashford (1867)
Sir Benjamin Lee Guinness, 1st Baronet (1798–1868)
Sir Arthur Edward Guinness, 2nd Baronet (1840–1915) (created Baron Ardilaun in 1880)

Barons Ardilaun (1880)
Arthur Edward Guinness, 1st Baron Ardilaun (1840–1915)

Guinness baronets, of Ashford and St. Stephen's Green(1867; reverted)
Sir Algernon Arthur St Lawrence Lee Guinness, 3rd Baronet (1883–1954)
Sir Kenelm Ernest Lee Guinness, 4th Baronet (1928–2011)
Sir Kenelm Edward Lee Guinness, 5th Baronet (born 1962)

The heir apparent is the present holder's only son Kenelm Arthur Lee Guinness (born 2005).

Guinness baronets, of Castle Knock (1885)
see Earl of Iveagh

See also
Guinness family

References
Kidd, Charles, Williamson, David (editors). Debrett's Peerage and Baronetage'' (1990 edition). New York: St Martin's Press, 1990.

Footnotes

 
Baronetcies in the Baronetage of the United Kingdom